Thallarcha rhaptophora is a moth in the subfamily Arctiinae. It was described by Oswald Bertram Lower in 1915. It is found in Australia, where it has been recorded from New South Wales, Victoria and Western Australia.

The wingspan is about 20 mm. The forewings are black and white with black zigzag lines and markings. The hindwings are pale yellow with a black mark near the middle and a back band around the apex.

References

Moths described in 1915
Lithosiini